Mare Orientale  (Latin orientāle, the "eastern sea") is a lunar mare. It is located on the western border of the near side and far side of the Moon, and is difficult to see from an Earthbound perspective. Images from spacecraft have revealed it to be one of the most striking large scale lunar features, resembling a target ring bullseye.

Geology
During the 1960s, rectified images of Mare Orientale by Gerard Kuiper at the Lunar and Planetary Laboratory gave rise to the notion of it being an impact crater. Compared with most other lunar basins, Mare Orientale is less flooded by mare basalts, so that much of the basin structure is visible. The collision caused ripples in the lunar crust, resulting in the three concentric circular features. The innermost rings of this vast, multi-ringed crater are the inner and outer Montes Rook, and the outermost ring are the Montes Cordillera,  in diameter.

The Apollo program did not sample rocks from Mare Orientale so its precise age is not known. However, it is the Moon's most recent impact basin, probably rather younger than the Imbrium Basin, which is about 3.85 billion years old. The surrounding basin material is of the Lower Imbrian epoch with the mare material being of the Upper Imbrian epoch.

Located at the antipode of Mare Orientale is Mare Marginis.

A mass concentration (mascon), or gravitational high, was identified in the center of Mare Orientale from Doppler tracking of the five Lunar Orbiter spacecraft in 1968.  The mascon was confirmed and mapped at higher resolution with later orbiters such as Lunar Prospector and GRAIL.

Discovery and name
Mare Orientale is difficult to observe from Earth, as it lies at the extreme western edge of the near side. All that can be seen are the rough mountain ranges—the Montes Rook and the Montes Cordillera—and some glimpses of the dark mare material beyond them. However, the Moon's libration means that on rare occasions Mare Orientale is turned slightly more toward the Earth, and becomes a little more discernible.

Although various astronomers had observed hints of the mare, it was first fully described by the German astronomer Julius Franz in his 1906 book Der Mond ("The Moon"). Franz also gave the mare its name, the "Eastern Sea", as it was located on what the convention at the time considered was the eastern side of the Moon as viewed from Earth, though it is the western side as viewed by an astronaut walking on the Moon. In 1961, however, the International Astronomical Union adopted the astronautic convention for East and West on the Moon and this limb became the western edge.

The first detailed study of the Mare Orientale was by Hugh Percy Wilkins, who called it "Lunar Mare X". Franz's discoveries were not well known, and in the 1976 edition of his book Guide to the Moon, Patrick Moore claims that he and Wilkins discovered and named Mare Orientale in 1946. However, Moore credits Franz as discoverer in his 2009 Yearbook of Astronomy (p. 133-135).

Gallery

See also
Volcanism on the Moon

References

Bibliography

Orientale, Mare
Orientale